Monroe is an unincorporated community and census-designated place in far eastern Le Flore County, Oklahoma, United States.

A post office was established at Monroe, Indian Territory, on February 25, 1881. It was named for its first postmaster, Simon Monroe Griffith.

At the time of its founding, Monroe was located in Skullyville County, a part of the Moshulatubbee District of the Choctaw Nation.

Demographics

References

Census-designated places in Le Flore County, Oklahoma
Census-designated places in Oklahoma
Fort Smith metropolitan area